was a Japanese Christian socialist activist and author.

Biography
Kinoshita was a native of Matsumoto, Nagano. After graduating from the predecessor of Waseda University, he returned to Nagano to work as a journalist and lawyer. He later converted to Christianity. Due to his support of the women’s rights movement and advocacy of social issues (particularly the Ashio Copper Mine Incident), he was jailed.

In 1901, Kinoshita joined Abe Isoo, Katayama Sen, Kōtoku Shūsui, and Kawakami Kiyoshi in founding the Shakai Minshūtō (Social Democratic Party). The new political party was quickly banned by the authorities. From 1903, he was an editor of the Heimin Shimbun, a leftist newspaper co-founded by Kōtoku.

In 1904, Kinoshita wrote articles critical of the Russo-Japanese War, and in 1905 unsuccessful ran for election. After the Heimin Shimbun was suppressed by the government, he began to write for the Shin Kigen Christian-socialist magazine. He wrote regularly for Fukuda Hideko's socialist women's magazine Sekai Fujin from 1907 to 1909. His anti-war novel, Pillar of Fire was banned by the government in 1910. He continued to write pacifist and socialist themed novels for the remainder of his career and in his final years was attracted by attempts to form a union of Christianity with Buddhism.

Kinoshita was also instrumental in abolishing licensed prostitution in Japan.

Works

Novels
  (1904-1906), translated into English by Kenneth Strong 
  (1904)
  (1907-1908)
  (1908)
  (1908)
  (1909)
  (1910)

Other
  (1906)
  (1907)
  (1907)
  (1907)
  (1907)
  (1907)
  (1907)
  (1908)
  (1909)
  (1910)
  (1911)
  (1911)
  (1912)
  (1921)
  (1934)

See also
Shinkigen

References

Janet Hunter: "Concise Dictionary of Modern Japanese History", University of California Press, 1984, S. 93
John Scott Miller: "Historical Dictionary of Modern Japanese Literature and Theater", Scarecrow Press, 2009, S. 53

1869 births
1937 deaths
Japanese Protestants
Japanese Christian socialists
Japanese writers
Japanese journalists
Waseda University alumni
Japanese Christian pacifists
People from Matsumoto, Nagano